Hvozdnice is a municipality and village in Hradec Králové District in the Hradec Králové Region of the Czech Republic. It has about 300 inhabitants.

History
The first written mention of Hvozdnice is from 1073.

References

External links

Villages in Hradec Králové District